The Drake Relays (officially the Drake Relays presented by Xtream powered by Mediacom) is an outdoor track and field event held in Des Moines, Iowa, in Drake Stadium on the campus of Drake University. Billed as America's Athletic Classic, it is regarded as one of the top track and field events in the United States. In 2020, the Drake Relays was named a Silver Level event on the World Athletics Continental Tour, one of only two competitions in the United States to earn Silver Level status.

History
The inaugural Drake Relays were held in 1910. The first meet drew just 100 spectators and 82 athletes, all from Des Moines-area colleges and high schools. The second year attendance grew to 250 athletes and a crowd of some 500 spectators. In 1914, the Relays saw its first world record set. By 1922, the Relays had expanded to two days and drew 10,000 fans, becoming the first major track and field event broadcast on radio. For the 1926 Relays, Drake Stadium was built on the site of the prior host, Haskins Field.

Women's events were added beginning in 1961 with Wilma Rudolph competing in the 100 meters. The 1966 Relays began a streak of 48 consecutive Saturdays with a sellout. In 1969, a $175,000 tartan track was installed. The events at the Relays would go all-metric in 1976 and the track was rebuilt as a 400-meter oval in 1978. It was resurfaced in 1983, and in 1988 was renamed the "Jim Duncan Track" to honor the long time relays public address announcer.

Hundreds of Olympic gold medalists have competed at Drake Stadium including Caitlyn Jenner, Michael Johnson, Carl Lewis, Jesse Owens, Wilma Rudolph, Frank Shorter, Gwen Torrence, and Jeremy Wariner. Hundreds more Drake Relays competitors have gone onto compete in the Olympic Games, including 113 at the 2012 Olympic Games.

In 2006, a Friday evening session was added. In 2010, the Grand Blue Mile, a one-mile road race in downtown Des Moines, was added. The week of festivities currently opens with a parade on Saturday, continues with a Beautiful Bulldog Contest (Drake's mascot) on Sunday, the Grand Blue Mile on Tuesday, and an indoor pole vault on Wednesday with the decathlon and heptathlon beginning Wednesday and concluding alongside the distance carnival on Thursday.

Midwest grocer Hy-Vee became the presenting sponsor beginning in 2013, enabling the Relays to offer a $50,000 purse in running events and $25,000 purse in field events, making the Drake Relays the richest athletics event in the United States. ESPN2 aired 90 minutes of live-action coverage that year and ESPN3 aired an additional two hours. The 2013 field saw 25 Olympic medalists compete. Currently NBCSN airs 2–3 hours of coverage on Saturday with live online coverage via NBCSports.com throughout the event.

In January 2018 Drake Relays unveiled the Blue Standard, under which Iowa's top high school athletes automatically qualify based on their event performance. The Blue Standard is the top 25 percent of accepted entrant's results from past Drake Relays.

In March 2020, Xtream powered by Mediacom was named the presenting sponsor of the Drake Relays. Xtream's sponsorship allows the Drake Relays to maintain its status as a premier track and field event, to be called the "Drake Relays presented by Xtream powered by Mediacom".

In addition to the track meet, the Relays serves as a second homecoming for the university and sees other community events such as student street painting and a downtown Des Moines block party.

Drake Stadium 

Opened in 1925, the 14,557-seat stadium and its famous blue oval have hosted the Relays since 1926. A $15 million renovation in 2006 reduced capacity from 18,000 seats in order to expand the lanes, allow fans to watch throwing and running at the same time, and allow for more hosting of events. Another renovation following the 2016 relays saw a new track installed, constructed of the same material used for tracks in Beijing and London for the Summer Olympics.

Relays Directors 
Eleven men have claimed the role of director of the Drake Relays since the very first officially organized track and field event took place more than 100 years ago back in the year 1910.

John L. Griffith 1910–1918Griffith was the founder of the Drake Relays. He remained director for nine years and moved to the University of Illinois after World War I. He later became commissioner of the Big Ten Conference. Drake's live bulldog mascot, Griff, is named for him.
M. B. Banks 1919–1921Banks also served as coach to the Drake football and basketball teams.
K. L. (Tug) Wilson 1922–1925Wilson was a former Illinois and Olympic athlete. After his tenure as director, he went on to become athletic director at Northwestern University. Wilson was also a former Big Ten Conference commissioner.
O. M. (Ossie) Solem 1926–1932Longtime Drake coach succeeded Wilson, later became head football coach at the University of Iowa and Syracuse University
F. P. (Pitch) Johnson 1933–1940
M. E. (Bill) Easton 1941–1947
Tom Deckard 1948–1955
Bob Karnes 1956–1969
Bob Ehrhart 1970–2000
Mark Kostek 2001–2005
Brian Brown 2006–2016Brown participated in the relays himself and held the Drake Relays record in the high jump until 2014. For his first eight years as director, Brown had attempted to have his record broken by recruiting some of the best high jumpers in the country.
Blake Boldon 2017–present

Meet records

Men

Women

Mixed

Drake Relays Results

Future dates
113th Drake Relays: April 26-29, 2023
114th Drake Relays: April 24-27, 2024

Notes

References

External links
 Drake Relays Official Website
 Drake Relays Records
 Drake Relays Digital Archives
 Drake Relays Hall of Fame Listing

Relays
Sports in Des Moines, Iowa
Annual track and field meetings
College track and field competitions in the United States
Tourist attractions in Des Moines, Iowa
Track and field in Iowa
Track and field competitions in the United States